Champagne-au-Mont-d'Or is a commune in the Metropolis of Lyon in Auvergne-Rhône-Alpes region in eastern France.

Population

References

External links

Official Website (in French)

Communes of Lyon Metropolis
Lyonnais